John James "Jack, Hay" Miller, last name occasionally spelt as Millar, (June 22, 1883 – June 15, 1944) was a Canadian professional ice hockey player. He played with the Renfrew Creamery Kings of the National Hockey Association, in the 1909–10 season. Previously, he played in the Ontario Hockey Association with Norwood, and in the Alberta Professional Hockey League with the Edmonton Pros. After his season in Renfrew, he returned to Alberta to play for the Stettler Hockey Club. He died in July 1944.

References

External links
Hay Millar at JustSportsStats

1883 births
1944 deaths
Canadian ice hockey left wingers
Ice hockey people from Ontario
Renfrew Hockey Club players